Neil Michael Hagerty is the debut solo album by Neil Michael Hagerty, formerly of Royal Trux.  It was released as an LP and CD by Drag City in 2001.

Track listing
All songs written by Hagerty

Side one
"Know That" – 2:40
"Fortune and Fear" – 5:18
"Repeat the Sound of Joy" – 1:15
"Kali, the Carpenter" – 5:25
"Whiplash in Park" – 4:32
"Creature Catcher" – 2:28

Side two
"I Found a Stranger" – 6:31
"Oh to Be Wicked Once Again" – 5:11
"Tender Metal" – 3:29
"The Menace" – 1:34
"Chicken, You Can Roost on the Moon" – 4:31

References

2001 debut albums
Drag City (record label) albums
Domino Recording Company albums